The  is a 4-laned national expressway in Hokkaidō, Japan. It is operated by the East Nippon Expressway Company.

Naming

The name Sasson is a kanji acronym of two characters. The first character represents  and the second represents , which are the two cities connected by the expressway.

Officially the expressway is a part of the Hokkaidō Ōdan Expressway Nemuro Route and Abashiri Route.

Overview

The first section of the expressway opened in 1971 with two lanes ahead of the 1972 Winter Olympics. Expansion to four lanes was completed in 1974. The entire route was completed in 1992 with a connection to the Dō-Ō Expressway.

The speed limit is 80 km/h along the entire route.

The section from Sapporo-nishi Interchange through Sapporo Junction to Sapporo-minami Interchange on the Dō-Ō Expressway is built to an urban expressway standard and tolls are charged at a flat rate. As of March 2008 the toll on this section is 400 yen for regular passenger cars. Tolls on all other sections of the expressway are assessed according to distance travelled in the same manner as most other national expressways.

List of interchanges and features

 IC - interchange, JCT - junction, PA - parking area, BS - bus stop, TN - tunnel, BR - bridge, TB - toll gate

References

External links 

 East Nippon Expressway Company

Expressways in Japan
Transport in Sapporo
Roads in Hokkaido